Kontarne is an urban-type settlement in Shakhtarsk Municipality (district) in Donetsk Oblast of eastern Ukraine. Population:

Demographics
Native language as of the Ukrainian Census of 2001:
 Ukrainian 9.82%
 Russian 89.42%
 Belarusian 0.10%
 Hungarian 0.05%

References

Urban-type settlements in Donetsk Raion